Europe Sees Syria is an international activist campaign that began in Glasgow, Scotland after the death of Alan Kurdi whose image made global headlines after he drowned in the Mediterranean Sea, as part of the Syrian refugee crisis. The Europe Sees Syria campaign works to help refugees and tackling European refugee crisis. The campaign was founded as a Facebook page by Alexis Stearns. Although the activists run a stable social media pages, the overall Europe Sees Syria movement is a decentralised network, and has no formal hierarchy or structure.

Description and events

The movement began after the death of Alan Kurdi whose image made global headlines after he drowned in the Mediterranean Sea, as part of the Syrian refugee crisis. Candlelight vigils in Scotland were organized through Facebook  by Alexis Stearns to show solidarity for Syrian refugees and the victims of war. Alexis Stearns stated that "as a wealthy country, many of our citizens want to register their disgust at how little our government is doing to tackle a very serious situation. We hope that other towns and cities will now be inspired to launch events so that we can send a message from every corner of the world."

More than 200,000 people have signed a nationwide petition calling on the UK Government to accept more asylum seekers and increase support for refugees. The Catholic Church in Scotland, the Church of Scotland, the Muslim Council of Scotland, and the Scottish Council of Jewish Communities have issued an Interfaith statement on the refugee crisis part of which reads ‘We welcome the UK and Scottish governments’ willingness to offer a safe haven to these desperate people. We urge them to back this with practical action to help as many refugees as possible, and we call on our communities to support this and make them welcome’.

Influence
St Mary's Cathedral in Glasgow hosted "Glasgow Hears Syria", a musical response to the refugee crisis. Funds raised by the event split between Amnesty International and the Migrant Offshore Aid Agency.

List of events

See also
 European refugee crisis
 Dungavel

References

External links
 
 Official Facebook page
 Interview with Fuad Alakbarov about Europe Sees Syria's success

2010s in Scotland
2015 in the United Kingdom
2015 in Europe
Social justice organizations
Anti-racism in Europe
European migrant crisis
2010s in Glasgow